Farchild Maccarthy was born in Muskegon, Michigan (May 28, 1896 – March 1977) was an American skeleton racer who competed in the late 1940s. He finished eighth in the men's skeleton event at the 1948 Winter Olympics in St. Moritz.

A cup competition on the Cresta Run in St. Moritz is named in his honor.

References
1948 men's skeleton results
October 24, 2005 Sports Illustrated article featuring Maccarthy.
Travelintelligence.net profile on St. Moritz featuring the cup in Maccarthy's honor
Wallechinsky, David (1984). "Skeleton (Cresta Run)". In The Complete Book of the Olympics: 1896 - 1980. New York: Penguin Books. p. 577.

1896 births
1977 deaths
American male skeleton racers
Skeleton racers at the 1948 Winter Olympics
Olympic skeleton racers of the United States
19th-century American people
20th-century American people